
Gmina Sochaczew is a rural gmina (administrative district) in Sochaczew County, Masovian Voivodeship, in east-central Poland. Its seat is the town of Sochaczew, although the town is not part of the territory of the gmina.

The village of Żelazowa Wola, which is within Gmina Sochaczew, is the birthplace of the composer Frédéric Chopin.

Villages
Gmina Sochaczew contains the villages and settlements of Altanka, Andrzejów Duranowski, Antoniew, Bielice, Bogdaniec, Bronisławy, Chodakówek, Chrzczany, Czerwonka-Parcel, Czerwonka-Wieś, Czyste, Dachowa, Dzięglewo, Feliksów, Gawłów, Ignacówka, Janaszówek, Janówek Duranowski, Jeżówka, Karwowo, Kąty, Kaźmierów, Kożuszki-Kolonia, Kożuszki-Ośrodek, Kożuszki-Parcel, Kuznocin, Łubianka, Lubiejew, Mokas, Nowe Mostki, Orły-Cesin, Pilawice, Rozlazłów, Sielice, Sochaczew-Wieś, Władysławów, Wójtówka, Wyczółki, Wyjazd, Wymysłów, Żdżarów, Żelazowa Wola, Zosin and Żuków.

Neighbouring gminas
Gmina Sochaczew is bordered by the town of Sochaczew and by the gminas of Brochów, Kampinos, Młodzieszyn, Nowa Sucha, Rybno and Teresin.

References
Polish official population figures 2006

Sochaczew
Sochaczew County